In Greek mythology, Idmon (Ancient Greek: Ἴδμων means "having knowledge of") was an Argonaut seer.

Family 
Allegedly a son of Apollo, he had Abas (or Ampycus) as his mortal father.  His mother was Asteria, daughter of Coronus, or Cyrene, or else Antianeira, daughter of Pheres. By Laothoe he had a son Thestor.

Mythology 
Idmon foresaw his own death in the Argonaut expedition, but joined anyway. During the outbound voyage of Argo, a boar killed him in the land of the Mariandyni, in Bithynia.

In 559 BC, the citizens of Megara Heraclea (today's Eregli) built a temple over Idmon's grave.

Notes

References 

 Apollodorus, The Library with an English Translation by Sir James George Frazer, F.B.A., F.R.S. in 2 Volumes, Cambridge, MA, Harvard University Press; London, William Heinemann Ltd. 1921. ISBN 0-674-99135-4. Online version at the Perseus Digital Library. Greek text available from the same website.
 Apollonius Rhodius, Argonautica translated by Robert Cooper Seaton (1853-1915), R. C. Loeb Classical Library Volume 001. London, William Heinemann Ltd, 1912. Online version at the Topos Text Project.
 Apollonius Rhodius, Argonautica. George W. Mooney. London. Longmans, Green. 1912. Greek text available at the Perseus Digital Library.
 Gaius Julius Hyginus, Fabulae from The Myths of Hyginus translated and edited by Mary Grant. University of Kansas Publications in Humanistic Studies. Online version at the Topos Text Project.
 Homer, The Iliad with an English Translation by A.T. Murray, Ph.D. in two volumes. Cambridge, MA., Harvard University Press; London, William Heinemann, Ltd. 1924. . Online version at the Perseus Digital Library.
 Homer, Homeri Opera in five volumes. Oxford, Oxford University Press. 1920. . Greek text available at the Perseus Digital Library.
 The Orphic Argonautica, translated by Jason Colavito. © Copyright 2011. Online version at the Topos Text Project.

Argonauts
Mythological Greek seers
Children of Apollo
Demigods in classical mythology
Argive characters in Greek mythology